The Marxe School of Public and International Affairs (commonly known as the Marxe School) is the public policy school of Baruch College. It was established in 1994. It is the only school under the City University of New York which is dedicated to public affairs. David S. Birdsell is the Marxe Dean of the Marxe School of Public and International Affairs.

History
In 1919, the City College School of Business and Civic Administration was established and would later become Baruch College. In 1951, the Department of Political Science in the school offered its first course in Masters in Public Administration. In 1968, Baruch College was created from the City College School of Business. In 1980, the Masters of Public Administration (MPA) program was accredited by Network of Schools of Public Policy, Affairs, and Administration, the first accredited program in New York City. In 1984, the college started offering Executive MPA courses, the first in New York City and the second in the United States. The Austin W. Marxe School of Public and International Affairs was established in 1994 with Ronald M. Berkman as the founding dean. He worked there from 1994 to 1997. The School of Public and International Affairs was later named after Austin W. Marxe who donated $30 million to the college in 2016. Austin W. Marxe was a 1965 graduate of Baruch College and an investment banker. It was the largest donation to Baruch College and the second largest in the history of City University of New York.

Academics
Marxe School of Public and International Affairs offers the following degree programs: Master of Public Administration, Executive Master of Public Administration, Masters of International Affairs, Master of Science in Education (Higher Education Administration), Bachelor of Science in Public Affairs, minor in Survey Research, and executive certificate programs.

Rankings

U.S. News & World Report placed the Marxe School of Public and International Affairs at 34th nationally in its ranking of MPA degrees in 2019.

References

Baruch College
Public administration schools in the United States
Schools of international relations in the United States
Educational institutions established in 1994
1994 establishments in New York City